The St. Croix River (Maliseet-Passamaquoddy: Skutik) is a river in northeastern North America,  in length, that forms part of the Canada–United States border between Maine (U.S.) and New Brunswick (Canada). The river rises in the Chiputneticook Lakes and flows south and southeast, between Calais and St. Stephen. It discharges into Passamaquoddy Bay, in the Bay of Fundy.

Geography
The river forms from the Chiputneticook Lakes (North Lake, East Grand Lake, Mud Lake, and Spednic Lake) along the Canadian - U.S. border. U.S. Geological Survey topographic maps show the St. Croix River as beginning at the  outlet stream from East Grand Lake, then flowing through the short Mud Lake and entering Spednic Lake, extending  to its outlet at Vanceboro, Maine, and the start of the river proper.

In the 20th century, the river was heavily developed for hydroelectric power. The river had previously hosted a large population of Atlantic salmon; however, the salmon population was reduced after building hydroelectric dams upriver from Calais-St. Stephen.

The river is an estuary between Calais-St. Stephen and the river's mouth at Robbinston and St. Andrews. This tidal area extends for approximately  along this section and exhibits a tidal bore.

Navigation
The Saint Croix River was an early trade corridor to interior Maine and New Brunswick from the Atlantic coast.  Ocean ships could navigate upstream to Calais and St. Stephen; although tidal fluctuation made Eastport a preferred port for deeper draft vessels.  The river upstream of Calais and St. Stephen became an important transportation corridor for log driving to bring wooden logs and pulpwood from interior forests to sawmills and paper mills built to use water power at Calais and Woodland.

Historical boundary issues
The boundary issues of the St. Croix River came out of the Treaty of Paris that was signed in 1783. The geography of the river was not charted clearly until the Jay Treaty (1794) provided provisions for surveying the boundary.  The boundary between Maine and New Brunswick north of the headwaters of the Saint Croix took another four decades to establish.  Following the War of 1812 there was a push to settle this disputed territory north of the St. Croix on the St. John watershed and it remained in dispute until 1842. During this conflict Maine, Massachusetts and New Brunswick continued to issue some lumbering permits to the disputed territory. With or without a permit, lumbermen were in a race to cut the best timber from the land while it was under dispute. Although it was illegal to cut trees with no permit, the Saint John River enabled this activity because it increased business at the local mills, shipyards and timber ponds in New Brunswick so the officials were slow to halt the ongoing illegal activity.

During this time, the lumbermen were very serious and competitive about the trees. Whoever got to the best trees first claimed them.  Dynamite was used as a tool of sabotage to blow up some of the log booms that were strung across the river to catch the recently cut trees. It is also known that at times the timber men purposely sorted their logs incorrectly to attempt to confuse local officials charged with regulating timber trade and transportation.

Water level monitoring

Canada
The Water Survey of Canada maintains six river flow gauges in the St. Croix River watershed:

 St. Croix, New Brunswick
 Baring, Maine
 Dennis Stream near St. Stephen, New Brunswick
 East Grand Lake at Forest City, New Brunswick
 Spednic Lake at St. Croix, New Brunswick
 Forest City Stream, below the Forest City Dam at Forest City, New Brunswick

United States
The United States Geological Survey maintains two river flow gauges in the St. Croix River watershed.

For water year 2001, the pH ranged from 6.6 to 7.2.

Crossings

Seven active international bridges cross the river at the following locations:

 St. Croix, New Brunswick-Vanceboro, Maine (Saint Croix-Vanceboro Bridge, road
 St. Croix-Vanceboro (Saint Croix-Vanceboro Railway Bridge), rail
 Mohannes, New Brunswick-Woodland, Maine (unnamed Maine Central Railroad bridge), rail
 Upper Mills, New Brunswick-Baring, Maine (unnamed Maine Central Railroad bridge), rail
 St. Stephen, New Brunswick-Calais, Maine, International Avenue Bridge, road
 St. Stephen, New Brunswick-Calais, Maine (Milltown International Bridge), road
 St. Stephen, New Brunswick-Calais, Maine (unnamed New Brunswick Southern Railway/Maine Central Railroad bridge), rail
 St. Stephen, New Brunswick-Calais, Maine (St. Stephen-Calais Bridge), road

One defunct crossing exists:
 St. Stephen, New Brunswick-Calais, Maine, ferry (at site of St. Stephen-Calais Bridge)

Derived names
HMCS St. Croix (I81), previously USS McCook (DD-252), became a Canadian ship in 1940 as part of the Destroyers for Bases Agreement. It was renamed after the St. Croix River to follow the Canadian tradition of naming destroyers after Canadian rivers while recognizing the shared national history of the ship.

Dam removal

New Brunswick Power has indicated their desire to remove the 138 year old Milltown Dam on the St Croix River between St. Stephen, New Brunswick (Canada), and Calais, Maine (USA).  Currently, New Brunswick Power stakeholders, government officials, the Peskotomuhkati Tribe, locals, and the public are examining this proposed dam removal. Milltown Dam removal would restore Salmon Falls between St. Stephen and Calais. The Peskotomuhkati Tribe is also advocating for the removal of Milltown Dam and the full restoration of Salmon Falls. Milltown Dam was built in 1881 by New Brunswick Power and is the oldest operating hydro facility in Canada. Atlantic Salmon, shad, eels, and alewives would all benefit from this dam's removal and ongoing habitat restoration. St Croix River oxygen levels would also improve with the restoration of Salmon Falls. Milltown Dam could be removed as early as 2022 pending regulatory approval.

See also
List of bodies of water of New Brunswick
List of rivers of Maine

References

External links

Rivers of Maine
Rivers of New Brunswick
Canada–United States border
Borders of Maine
International rivers of North America